Païsius or Païsios is a given name. Notable people with the name include:

Saints
 Pishoy or Bishoy, 320-417 AD, an Egyptian desert father and Christian saint; Παΐσιος Paisios is the Greek form and Paisius the Latin form
 Saint Paisius of Uglich, Abbot (1504)
 Saint Paisius Velichkovsky, 17th century monk and theologian, the founder of modern Eastern Orthodox staretsdom
 Saint Paisius of Hilendar (Paisiy Hilendarski), an 18th-century Bulgarian National Revival figure
 Saint Paisios (Eznepidis), also known as Elder Paisios of Mount Athos, a 20th-century schema-monk

Hierarchs
 Patriarch Paisius I of Jerusalem, 17th century
 Patriarch Paisius of Alexandria, patriarch from 1657 to 1678
 Patriarch Paisius I of Constantinople
 Patriarch Paisius II of Constantinople, 18th century
 Serbian Patriarch Paisius I (1614-1647)
 Serbian Patriarch Paisius II (1758)
 Paisius Ligarides
 Paisius II of Caesarea, Metropolitan of Caesarea in Cappadocia from 1832 to 1871